Ellerker Bradshaw (1 December 1680 – 1742), of Risby, Yorkshire, was a British politician who sat in the House of Commons  between 1727 and 1741.

Bradshaw was the eldest son of Sir James Bradshaw of Bromborough, Cheshire and his wife Dorothy Elleker, daughter  of John Ellerker of Risby, through whom he acquired the estate of Risby, three miles from Beverley. Bradshaw married Rebecca Northey, daughter of Sir Edward Northey.

He was returned as  Member of Parliament for Beverley at the  1727 British general election, but was unseated on petition on 8 March 1729. His agents at the election were committed to Newgate prison by the House of Commons for ‘notorious and scandalous bribery and corruption’ and as a result the Bribery Act was passed in 1729. He was returned again for Beverley at the 1734 British general election and voted  with the Government on the Spanish convention in 1739. He was defeated at the 1741 British general election.

Bradshaw died 28 June 1742, leaving two daughters.

References

External links

1680 births
1742 deaths
Members of the Parliament of Great Britain for English constituencies
British MPs 1727–1734
British MPs 1734–1741